UFC 159: Jones vs. Sonnen was a mixed martial arts event held on April 27, 2013, at the Prudential Center in Newark, New Jersey.

Background

Jimy Hettes was expected to face Steven Siler at the event; however, Hettes was forced out of the bout with an injury and replaced by Kurt Holobaugh.

Joe Proctor was expected to face Al Iaquinta at the event.  However, the bout was scrapped as both fighters sustained training injuries leading up to the fight.

Johnny Bedford was expected to face Erik Perez at the event.  However, Perez pulled out of the bout just days before the event citing an injury and was replaced by Bryan Caraway.

Welterweights Nick Catone and James Head were scheduled to face each other on this card.  However, at the weigh ins Catone missed weight and the bout was subsequently pulled from the card the day of the show after Catone went to the hospital for dehydration. The bout was scrapped as a result.

Results

Bonus Awards

Fighters were awarded $65,000 bonuses.

 Fight of the Night:  Pat Healy vs. Jim Miller ^
 Knockout of the Night: Roy Nelson
 Submission of the Night: Bryan Caraway ^
^ Double bonus winner Pat Healy had his awards rescinded after testing positive for marijuana during his post fight drug screening.

See also
List of UFC events
2013 in UFC

References

Ultimate Fighting Championship events
2013 in mixed martial arts
Mixed martial arts in New Jersey
Sports competitions in Newark, New Jersey
2013 in New Jersey